Surya Citra Televisi (SCTV) is an Indonesian free-to-air television network. It was launched on 24 August 1990 in Surabaya, East Java as  Surabaya Centra Televisi, broadcasting to the city and its surrounding area. At first, the programming was similar to that of RCTI, broadcasting foreign shows and some of RCTI news programs until they could produce their own. On 30 January 1993, SCTV obtained a national license and eventually moved its operations to Jakarta, changing its name to Surya Citra Televisi. Its main offices are located in Central Jakarta, with studios in West Jakarta. It is owned by Surya Citra Media, a publicly-listed subsidiary of the technology company Emtek.

On 18 February 2011, the commissioners of its parent companies Indosiar and SCTV agreed to a merger, although this was subject to government approval due to both companies going public.

Programs

Local programming 
In 2001, SCTV's affiliated television station in East Java launched the East Java edition of Liputan 6 SCTV which can only be seen in Surabaya. The North Sumatra edition of Liputan 6 SCTV is seen on SCTV Medan at 9:30 am and re-run at 4:00 pm on SCTV; this version debuted in 1997. Depending on the relay station, additional then-local television channel in Jakarta O Channel (now Moji) programs may also be seen.

TV series 
To produce TV series, SCTV previously turned to Indonesia's leading production house, such as Multivision Plus, Starvision Plus, Prima Entertainment, Soraya Intercine Films, Screenplay Productions, Amanah Surga Produksi (AS Productions), and Mega Kreasi Films, to presented various of the most popular soap operas. There are Deru Debu (Beyond the Dust), Melati, Permata Hati (Purest Hearts), Rahasia Perkawinan (Wedding Agreement), Bayangan Adinda (Adinda's Shadows), Heart the Series, Sephia, Putri Duyung (The Mermaid), Cowokku Superboy (My Boyfriend is Superboy), Bidadari Takut Jatuh Cinta (Fairies Who Afraid of Falling in Love), Putih Abu-Abu (White and Gray) (Since 2012), Cintaku Bersemi di Putih Abu-Abu (My Love Blooms in White and Gray) The Series (Since 2012), Diam-Diam Suka (Secret Love), Ganteng-Ganteng Serigala (Wolf Handsomes), Emak Ijah Pengen Ke Mekkah (Mother Ijah Wants to Mecca), and Mermaid In Love.

On Christmas 2016, production company SinemArt Productions left their long-time channel RCTI for SCTV after 9 years ceased its partnership (since 2003 till 2007). SinemArt produced Anak Langit (Sky Child), Anak Sekolahan (School Child), Berkah Cinta (Love Blessing), and rebooting the 2000s soap operas, Siapa Takut Jatuh Cinta? (Who's Afraid to Fall in Love?) for SCTV.

Latest television series in 2022, namely Cinta 2 Pilihan (Love 2 Choices), Tajwid Cinta (Tajweed Love), Cinta setelah Cinta (Love after Love), and Takdir Cinta yang Kupilih (The Destiny of Love I Choose)

Sports programming

Current

International

Previous

Indonesia

International

Presenters

Current
 Azizah Hanum (former CNN Indonesia anchor)
 David Rizal
 Dazen Vrilla
 Djati Darma
 Gracia Bern Tobing (former TVRI Sumut anchor)
 Joy Astro (former RCTI anchor)
 Nabiel Abiyasha
 Riko Anggara (former Kompas TV anchor)
 Risca Andalina
 Reza Ramadhansyah (former tvOne anchor)
 Skolastika Sylvia
 Yuliana Fonataba

Former
 Agung Nugroho
 Ajeng Kamaratih
 Alfito Deannova (now at detikcom)
 Alisya Ramadhan (now at Radio Sonora)
 Anastasya Putri
 Anelies Praramadhani
 Anneke Wijaya (now at CNBC Indonesia)
 Ariana Herawati
 Arief Suditomo (now an editor-in-chief at MetroTV)
 Ariyo Ardi (now at GTV and MNC News)
 Bayu Sutiyono (now at Kompas TV)
 Beverly Gunawan (now as the Corporate Communication Head of Emtek)
 Boy Bakamaro Ginting
 Brigitta Priscilla
 Budi Wicaksono (now at Kompas TV)
 David Silahooij (now at MNC News)
 Demis Djamaoeddin
 Deti Soepandi
 Dian Ardianti
 Diana Deborah
 Dorothea Ayu
 Duma Riris Silalahi
 Dwi Anggia (now at tvOne)
 Erwin Dwinanto
 Eva Julianti Yunizar (now at CNN Indonesia)
 Farhannisa Nasution (now at CNN Indonesia, Trans7 and Trans TV)
 Fauzan Zaman
 Fajra Septisio (now at Kompas TV)
 Fitha Dahana
 Grace Natalie (now at Partai Solidaritas Indonesia)
 Inayah Sari (now at Radio Sonora)
 Indiarto Priadi (now at tvOne)
 Indriati Yulistiani
 Indy Rahmawati
 Ira Koesno
 Jeremy Teti
 Juanita Wiratmaja
 Kania Sutisnawinata (now at MetroTV)
 Karni Ilyas (now an editor-in-chief at tvOne)
 Kevin Lilliana
 Louisa Kusnandar (now at BTV)
 Mochamad Achir (now at SEA Today)
 Nova Poerwadi
 Nova Rini
 Nunung Setiyani
 Paul Felle
 Pramita Andini
 Prisca Niken
 Putri Permatasari
 Rahmat Ibrahim (now at Kompas TV)
 Retno Pinasti (now only serves as editor-in-chief at SCM)
 Ricardo Indra
 Rike Amru (now at BTV)
 Riza Primadi
 Rizal Mustary
 Robby Muthalika (now at Kompas TV)
 Rosiana Silalahi (now an editor-in-chief at Kompas TV)
 Roy Chuddin
 Sella Wangkar
 Senandung Nacita
 Tascha Liudmila (now at BTV)
 Tasya Syarief (now at RTV)
 Tjandra Wibowo
 Tri Ambarwatie
 Valerina Daniel (now at BTV)
 Wandra Putra Mahendra
 Yuke Mayaratih
 Yusril Hamdhi (now at Sonora FM)
 Zivanna Letisha

Slogans
 SCTV, Surabaya Televisi (1990-1991)
 Ayo SCTV-Selangkah Lebih Maju (1991-1993)
 Saluran Hiburan dan Informasi (1991-1993, together with RCTI)
 Selalu Siap Menemani Anda/Selalu Siap Menemanimu  (1993-1997)
 Ayo SCTV (1994-1997)
 SCTV NgeTop! (1997-2005)
 Semakin Istimewa (1990s-2005)
 Satu Untuk Semua (2005–present)

Anniversary Specials
 Gemerlap Surya Citra (1996-1997)
 Surya Gemilang (1998-2001)
 Sejuta Warna Negeriku (2002)
 Satu Dalam Kebersamaan (2004)
 15 Tahun SCTV Satu Untuk Semua (2005)
 Penuh Kemilau (2005, sub-slogan)
 Terima Kasih Untuk Semua (2006)
 Pesona Wajah Indonesia (2010)
 Harmoni Cinta Indonesia (2011)
 22 Tahun Istimewa (2012)
 2 Dunia 3 Cerita (2013)
 24 Tahun Teristimewa (2014)
 25 Tahun Teristimewa Gojigo (2015)
 26 Tahun Kontribusi SCTV Untuk Indonesia (2016)
 27 Tahun Satu Untuk Semua (2017)
 Tetap Berkarya Untuk Indonesia (2018)
 Cinta Indonesia (2019)
 3xtra0rdinary (2020)
 XtraOrdinary (2021-2022)

Station ID
1990-1991: The first station ID shows the 1990-2005 logo with rippling blue background.
1991-1993: The second station ID shows the SCTV logo 1990-2005 being placed over with rippling water background.
1993-1997: The third station ID begins with the blue water background and the water ripple, then the various pictures of Indonesia appear, we see the ripple from the previous logo of SCTV 1990-2005, the letters and semicircle are shown and the blue line wipes in.
1997-2005: The fifth station ID shows the real live action segments, such as: Kids, Family, Basketball, Farmer, Airport, Pottery, and Entertainment. The ending is the SCTV NgeTop! logo with orange background.
2005–present: The sixth and most recent station ID shown as Satu Untuk Semua taglines.

See also 
 Indosiar
 Moji
 RCTI, former sister channel (1990–2000).
 List of television stations in Indonesia

Notes

References 

SCTV (TV network)
Television networks in Indonesia
Television channels and stations established in 1990
Mass media in Surabaya
Mass media in Jakarta
1990 establishments in Indonesia
Elang Mahkota Teknologi